The 1983 FIG Rhythmic Gymnastics World Cup was the first edition of the Rhythmic Gymnastics World Cup, held from April 15 to April 17 in Belgrade, Yugoslavia. The competition was officially organized by the International Gymnastics Federation and followed the steps of the Artistic Gymnastics World Cup, first held in 1975.

Medalists

Medal table

See also
 World Rhythmic Gymnastics Championships
 FIG World Cup
 List of medalists at the FIG World Cup Final

References

Rhythmic Gymnastics World Cup
International gymnastics competitions hosted by Yugoslavia
1983 in gymnastics